The Bukit Kiara Sports Complex is the main sports complex in Bukit Kiara, Kuala Lumpur, Malaysia. Juara Stadium and the National Lawn Bowls Centre form part of the sports complex.

See also
 KL Sports City

References

Sports venues in Kuala Lumpur
Badminton venues in Malaysia
Bowls in Malaysia
Sports complexes